Kankagrambhukti  was an ancient and medieval region/ territory spread across what are now Birbhum, Purba Bardhaman, Paschim Bardhaman and Murshidabad districts in the Indian state of West Bengal.

Ancient Rarh region was divided into several smaller regions – Kankangrambhukti, Bardhamanbhukti and Dandabhukti, as part of the Gupta Empire. Kankagram was located on the banks of the Hooghly.

References

Birbhum district
Purba Bardhaman district
Paschim Bardhaman district
Murshidabad district
Ancient divisions in Bengal